

Ferdinand Noeldechen (26 April 1895 – 20 October 1951) was a general in the Wehrmacht of Nazi Germany during World War II who commanded the 96. Infanterie-Division. He was a recipient of the Knight's Cross of the Iron Cross.

Awards and decorations

 Knight's Cross of the Iron Cross on 8 June 1943 as Generalmajor and commander of 96. Infanterie-Division

References

Citations

Bibliography

 

1895 births
1951 deaths
Lieutenant generals of the German Army (Wehrmacht)
German Army personnel of World War I
Prussian Army personnel
Recipients of the Gold German Cross
Recipients of the Knight's Cross of the Iron Cross
People from Starogard Gdański
People from West Prussia
Reichswehr personnel
German Army generals of World War II